Thomas O'Mahony (died 20 July 1924) was an Irish Cumann na nGaedheal politician who sat as a Teachta Dála (TD) in Dáil Éireann in the 1920s.

At the 1923 general election, he was elected for the Cork East constituency to the 4th Dáil. He died less than a year later, on 20 July 1924. The by-election for his Dáil seat was held on 18 November 1924, and won by the Cumann na nGaedheal candidate Michael K. Noonan.

References

Year of birth missing
1924 deaths
Cumann na nGaedheal TDs
Members of the 4th Dáil
Politicians from County Cork